Dejan "Švaba" Đurđević (born 4 July 1967) is a Serbian football manager and former player. He is the manager of China U-23.

Playing career
Born in Lazarevac, Đurđević started out at his local club Kolubara, before moving to OFK Beograd in the 1989–90 season. He later moved abroad to Sweden and joined Vasalunds IF. In 1998, Đurđević returned to OFK Beograd, spending the next two seasons at the club.

Managerial career
After hanging up his boots, Đurđević started working in the youth system at OFK Beograd. He subsequently took charge of the Serbia U17s and led the team to the 2008 UEFA European Under-17 Championship. In December 2008, Đurđević was appointed manager of Čukarički.

In June 2009, Đurđević became manager of OFK Beograd. He left the club after two and a half years and moved abroad to Uzbekistan, being appointed manager at Pakhtakor Tashkent in December 2011.

In October 2012, Đurđević took charge at Radnički Kragujevac. He was released by the club in April 2013, following poor results. In June 2014, Đurđević returned to OFK Beograd.

On 24 February 2023, Đurđević was appointed as new head coach of China U-23.

References

External links
 
 
 

Apollon Smyrnis F.C. players
Association football midfielders
Expatriate football managers in Uzbekistan
Expatriate footballers in Greece
Expatriate footballers in Sweden
First League of Serbia and Montenegro players
FK Čukarički managers
FK Čukarički players
FK Kolubara players
FK Radnički 1923 managers
FK Zemun managers
OFK Beograd managers
OFK Beograd players
Pakhtakor Tashkent FK managers
Serbia and Montenegro expatriate footballers
Serbia and Montenegro expatriate sportspeople in Greece
Serbia and Montenegro expatriate sportspeople in Sweden
Serbia and Montenegro footballers
Serbian expatriate football managers
Serbian expatriate sportspeople in Uzbekistan
Serbian football managers
Serbian footballers
Serbian SuperLiga managers
Super League Greece players
Uzbekistan Super League managers
Vasalunds IF players
Yugoslav First League players
Yugoslav footballers
1967 births
Living people